Dihydrolevoglucosenone (Cyrene) is a bicyclic, chiral, seven-membered heterocyclic cycloalkanone which is a waste derived and fully biodegradable aprotic dipolar solvent. It is a environmentally friendly alternative to dimethylformamide (DMF) and N-methyl-2-pyrrolidone (NMP).

Preparation 
Dihydrolevoglucosenone can be prepared through the hydrogenation of unsaturated ketone levoglucosenone (LGO) with heterogenous palladium catalysts under mild conditions. LGO is a chemical building block obtained by acid-catalyzed pyrolysis  of lignocellulosic biomass such as sawdust.

Properties 
Dihydrolevoglucosenone is a clear colorless, to light-yellow liquid with a mild, smoky ketone-like odor. It is miscible with water and many organic solvents.  Dihydrolevoglucosenone has a boiling point of 226 °C at 101.325 kPa (vs 202 °C for NMP), and a vapor pressure of 14.4 Pa near room temperature (25  °C). It has a comparatively high dynamic viscosity of 14.5 cP (for comparison DMF: 0.92 cP at 20 °C, NMP: 1.67 cP at 25 °C).

The compound is stable at temperatures up to 195 °C and weak acids and bases. Dihydrolevoglucosenone can react with inorganic bases via an aldol condensation mechanism. Dihydrolevoglucosenone is readily biodegradable (99% within 14 days) and reacts to oxidants such as aqueous 30% hydrogen peroxide solution even at room temperature.

Applications

Dihydroglucosenone as a precursor 
Dihydrolevoglucosenone can be used as a renewable building block to produce valuable chemicals such as drugs, flavours and fragrances and specialty polymers.

As dihydrolevoglucosenone is produced as a single enantiomer, it can be used for chiral pool synthesis. For instance, oxidation with peroxy acids such as peroxyacetic acid produces optically pure 5-hydroxymethyldihydrofuranone, from which zalcitabine, formerly a HIV drug, is available.

]

In a two-step hydrogenation process with a metal catalyst – first at 60 °C then at 180 °C – 1,6-hexanediol is mainly obtained via several intermediates. 1,6-hexanediol can be used as a starting material for the production of polyesters, polyurethanes and diamine 1,6-diaminohexane.

At elevated temperature and in the presence of a palladium catalyst, hydrogenolysis of dihydrolevoglucosenone via levoglucosanol selectively yields tetrahydrofuran-2,5-dimethanol (THF-dimethanol), which is a biodegradable solvent and a bio-based precursor to 1,6-hexanediol (and 1,6-diaminohexane).

Dihydroglucosenone as a safer solvent 
The search for alternative "green" solvents made from biomass or low-cost renewable raw materials, which are accessible through high-efficiency processes, in high yields, and meet the performance of conventional solvents, has triggered intensive research activities in industry and academia worldwide.

Dihydrolevoglucosenone is considered a "green" replacement for DMF. Several standard reactions of organic chemistry, e.g. Menshutkin reaction, Sonogashira coupling, Suzuki-Miyaura coupling and the production of ureas have been carried out in dihydrolevoglucosenone.

Production
Circa Group produces dihydrolevoglucosenone from cellulose under the Cyrene brand and has built a 50-tonne demonstration plant with partners in Tasmania. The company estimates that dihydroglucosenone performs better than NMP in 45% and comparably to NMP in 20% of trials to date. Circa received authorization in 2018 from the European Chemicals Agency (ECHA) to produce or import up to 100 tonnes per year of dihydroglucosenone to the EU.

Literature 
DS van Es: Study into alternative (biobased) polar aprotic solvents. Wageningen University, Wageningen 2017 (wur.nl [PDF]).
JH Clark, A. Hunt, C. Topi, G. Paggiola, J. Sherwood: Sustainable Solvents: Perspectives from Research, Business and Institutional Policy . Royal Society of Chemistry, London 2017,  .

References 

Cyclic ketones
Solvents
Heterocyclic compounds with 2 rings
Ethers
Oxygen heterocycles